Hymns to the Night is a set of six poems written by the German Romantic poet Novalis between 1797 and 1800, often considered to be the climax of Novalis’ lyrical works and among the most important poetry of early German Romanticism. A revised version of the poems was published in the Athenaeum by Friedrich Schlegel in 1800.

Description

The six hymns contain many elements which can be understood as autobiographical. Even though a lyrical "I", rather than Novalis himself, is the speaker, there are many relationships between the hymns and Hardenberg's experiences from 1797 to 1800.

The topic is the romantic interpretation of life and death, the threshold of which is symbolised by the night. Life and death are – according to Novalis – developed into entwined concepts. So in the end, death is the romantic principle of life.

Influences from the literature of that time can be seen. The metaphors of the hymns are closely connected to the books Novalis had read at about the time of his writing of the hymns. These are prominently Shakespeare’s Romeo and Juliet (in the translation by A.W. Schlegel, 1797) and Jean Paul’s Unsichtbare Loge (1793).

The Hymns to the Night display a universal religion with an intermediary. This concept is based on the idea that there is always a third party between a human and God. This intermediary can either be Jesus – as in Christian lore – or the dead beloved as in the hymns. These works consist of three times two hymns. These three components are each structured in this way: the first hymn shows, with the help of the Romantic triad, the development from an assumed happy life on earth through a painful era of alienation to salvation in the eternal night; the following hymn tells of the awakening from this vision and the longing for a return to it. With each pair of hymns, a higher level of experience and knowledge is shown. Some of the poems notably lament the historical replacement of European Paganism by Christianity, creating ambiguity about the exact view of the Hymns on Christianity and polytheism.

References

German poems
18th-century poems
Works by Novalis